Hon. Rabindra Pratap Shah (born 27 June 1957) was, as of 2012, Inspector General of Nepal Police of the Nepal Police. On 2 June 2011, he assumed the duties of the chief of Nepal Police, after succeeding Ramesh Chand Thakuri. Shah was born in Maidi in the Dhading District, and graduated from Tribhuvan University with a Bachelor's degree in Business Administration.
  
Shah joined the Nepalese police service on 1 September 1982, as an Inspector of Police. Later he served sequentially as In-Charge of six District Police Offices and three Zonal Police Offices. He was promoted to the rank of Deputy Inspector General of Police in 2006 and served as the Director of the Training Directorate as well as Chief of a Regional Police Office.

As of 2014, Former police chief Rabindra Pratap Shah is now a Constituent Assembly (CA) member representing the UCPN (Maoist) party.

References

1957 births
Living people
People from Dhading District
Tribhuvan University alumni
Nepalese communists
Inspectors General of Police (Nepal)
Members of the 2nd Nepalese Constituent Assembly